Arthur Briggs (27 May 1900 – 12 March 1987) was an English footballer who played as a goalkeeper for Hull City, Tranmere Rovers and Swindon Town. He made 246 appearances for Tranmere.

References

1900 births
1987 deaths
Footballers from Newcastle upon Tyne
English footballers
Association football goalkeepers
Hull City A.F.C. players
Tranmere Rovers F.C. players
Swindon Town F.C. players